On March 27, 2003, deputy defense minister of Afghanistan general Abdul Rashid Dostum created an office for the North Zone of Afghanistan and appointed officials to it, defying interim president Hamid Karzai's orders that there be no zones in Afghanistan.

External links 
https://publicintelligence.net/islamic-republic-of-afghanistan-detailed-governance-information/ 

Subdivisions of Afghanistan
2000s in Afghanistan